Giorgio Fieschi (ca. 1395 – October 1461) was an Italian cardinal, of the counts of Lavagna.

He was elected Bishop of Mariana, in Corsica, on 27 May 1433. On 3 October 1436 he was transferred to the metropolitan see of Genoa, which he occupied until 18 December 1439, when Pope Eugenius IV raised him to the cardinalate in order to secure the support of Republic of Genoa in the conflict with antipope Felix V.

He was bishop in commendam of Sagona (1443–45), bishop of Noli (1447–48) and bishop of Albenga (1448–59). He was administrator of the see of Luni, 1446.

He was promoted to the suburbicarian see of Palestrina on 5 March 1449. He acted as papal legate in Liguria in the pontificate of Pope Martin V. As dean of the Sacred College of Cardinals, he opted for the suburbicarian see of Ostia (proper of the dean) on 28 April 1455. He died in Rome on 8 or 11 October 1461.

References

External links

1461 deaths
15th-century Italian cardinals
Cardinal-bishops of Ostia
Cardinal-bishops of Palestrina
Deans of the College of Cardinals
Roman Catholic archbishops of Genoa
Bishops of Albenga
Bishops of Noli
15th-century Italian Roman Catholic archbishops
Year of birth uncertain
Bishops of Sagone
Fieschi family